The 1991 Copa del Rey Final was the 89th final of the Spanish cup competition, the Copa del Rey. The final was played at Estadio Santiago Bernabéu in Madrid on 29 June 1991. The match was won by Atlético Madrid, who beat RCD Mallorca 1–0.

Details

1991
1990–91 in Spanish football cups
Atlético Madrid matches
RCD Mallorca matches
June 1991 sports events in Europe